Harrison Kurtz (born September 15, 1997) is an American soccer player who currently plays college soccer at Seattle University.

Career
Kurtz began his youth career with the Crossfire Premier Academy before joining the Seattle Sounders FC Academy in 2012.  On February 3, 2016, it was announced that Kurtz signed a letter of intent to play college soccer at Clemson University.  He made his professional debut on March 30 for USL club Seattle Sounders FC 2 in a 2–0 defeat to Arizona United.  Despite appearing for S2, he is still able to maintain his college eligibility.

In 2018 Kurtz change college to play for Seattle U.

References

External links
USSF Development Academy bio

1997 births
Living people
American soccer players
Clemson Tigers men's soccer players
Seattle Redhawks men's soccer players
Tacoma Defiance players
Seattle Sounders FC U-23 players
Association football midfielders
Soccer players from Washington (state)
USL League Two players
USL Championship players